Part of the Banchō area,  is an upscale, mostly residential district of Chiyoda, Tokyo, Japan.  As of June 2020, the population of this district is 1,732 in 719 households.

Education

 operates public elementary and junior high schools. Banchō Elementary School (番町小学校) is the zoned elementary school for Rokubanchō. There is a freedom of choice system for junior high schools in Chiyoda Ward, and so there are no specific junior high school zones.

References

Districts of Chiyoda, Tokyo